The Samsung Series 7 Slate, XE700T1A, is a  tablet manufactured by Samsung. The Slate 7 was announced on August 31, 2011, incorporates a dual-core 1.6 GHz Intel Core i5-2467M (Sandy Bridge) processor, and runs the Windows 7 Home Premium or Professional operating system.

Hardware
The Samsung Series 7 Slate is built using a mixture of plastic and glass. A micro HDMI port, MicroSD slot, and a full-size USB 2.0 port are incorporated into the design, as well as a volume rocker, power button, rotation lock, headphone jack and charging port located on the sides. A physical home button is located directly below the screen. A dock connector is located on the bottom. The Series 7 Slate uses a  PLS display at a resolution of 1366x768. The tablet is available with either 64 or 128 GB of internal storage which is expandable via an external microSD card.

Reception
Engadget praised the Series 7 Slate's bright display and responsive touchscreen. It was also said that there are useful accessories - a stylus, bluetooth keyboard and a dock with two USB 2.0, ethernet, full HDMI port and headphone jack. Overall the device is one of the best Windows 7 tablets around.

Samsung Windows Developer Preview PC

Microsoft during its BUILD 2011 conference announced that it's giving away 5,000 Samsung-built developer "PCs" to attendees, with AT&T's 3G service. Each of the 5,000 attendees of Microsoft's getting a 700T Windows Developer Preview tablet PC and Bluetooth keyboard combo loaded with the Developer Preview of Windows 8 (8012.winmain_win8m3) and different UEFI. Although the device was claimed to be a prototype, was near identical (with hardware differences) to the production-version of the Samsung Series 7 Slate PC model 700T1A. It is also the same secret device shown off at TechEd New Zealand earlier in 2011.

References

Series 7 Slate
Tablet computers
Tablet computers introduced in 2011